Barnaby is a masculine given name and a surname.

Barnaby may also refer to:
 Barnaby, New Brunswick, Canada, a community
 Barnaby River, in New Brunswick, Canada
 Barnaby Records, an American record company
 Barnaby (comics), American comic strip

See also 
 St Barnaby's Thistle (Centaurea solstitialis), plant
 
 
 Barnabas
 Barnabe (disambiguation)
 Barnabé
 Barney (disambiguation)
 Bernabe (disambiguation)
 Bernabé (disambiguation)
 Burnaby